Harrison James Burrows (born 12 January 2002) is an English professional footballer who plays for EFL League One side Peterborough United.

Career
Burrows joined the Peterborough United academy at the age of 6 after attending a development centre. Burrows went on to feature in a pre-season friendly against Ipswich Town in 2017 at just 15 years old. The midfielder signed his first professional contract in January 2019, making his debut for the club in August 2019 in an EFL Cup match against Oxford United. He went on to make his full league debut, aged just 17 in a 4–0 win against MK Dons.

Career statistics

References

2002 births
Living people
People from Cambridgeshire
English footballers
Association football midfielders
Peterborough United F.C. players
English Football League players